Ethmia comitella is a moth in the family Depressariidae. It is found in Korea, China and Russia.

Adults have been recorded in early and mid-June.

Subspecies
Ethmia comitella comitella (China: Central Tien Shan)
Ethmia comitella steppella Dubatolov et Ustjuzhanin, 1997 (East Siberia)

References

Moths described in 1927
comitella